The tennis rivalry between Novak Djokovic and Rafael Nadal is the most prolific in men's tennis in the Open Era. It is widely considered by players, coaches, and pundits to be among the greatest rivalries in tennis history. The pair have contested at least one professional match every year since 2006, and the ATP Tour listed the rivalry as the third-greatest of the 2000s decade, despite only starting in 2006.

The two have faced each other 59 times, including in all four major finals, with Djokovic leading 30–29 overall. Djokovic leads 15–13 in finals of all levels, while Nadal leads 11–7 at the majors,  including 5–4 in major finals. Nadal leads 8–2 at the French Open and 2–1 at the US Open, while Djokovic leads 2–0 at the Australian Open and 2–1 at Wimbledon. To date, Djokovic is the only player to have beaten Nadal in all four majors.

Of their 59 meetings, 27 matches have been on hard courts with Djokovic leading 20–7, 28 on clay with Nadal leading 20–8, and 4 on grass where they are tied 2–2.

The first meeting occurred at the 2006 French Open in the quarterfinals, where Nadal prevailed after Djokovic retired with an injury in the third set; Djokovic later commented to the media that he understood what he needed to do to beat Nadal and claiming Nadal "was beatable on clay". Their first encounter in a final came at the 2007 Indian Wells Masters where Nadal won the event. Djokovic's first victory came in their third meeting against each other at the 2007 Miami Masters where he won the event.

Between 2006 and 2009, this rivalry was overshadowed by Nadal's rivalry with Roger Federer. It started to become widely recognized when the pair contested their first major final at the 2010 US Open. From March 2011 to April 2013, the pair contested eleven consecutive tournament finals, with Djokovic winning eight and Nadal three, the only duo to achieve such a feat in the Open Era. It is one of two rivalries in men's tennis (the other one being the Djokovic-Murray rivalry) to involve meetings in the finals of all four majors, including four consecutive finals in 2011–12, and a record 29 Masters matches.

Some of their matches are considered to be classics and among the greatest matches of all time including the 2009 Madrid Masters semifinal, 2011 Miami Masters final, the 2012 Australian Open final, the 2013 French Open semifinal, 2018 Wimbledon semifinal, and the 2021 French Open semifinal. Their 2012 Australian Open final has been lauded as the greatest match ever played by some long-time tennis pundits, analysts, and former players and legends of the sport.

History

2006 
The first meeting between the two, and the only one in 2006, was in the quarterfinals at the French Open. The victory went to Nadal via a retirement from Djokovic after Nadal took the first two sets.

2007 
In 2007, the pair met seven times, Nadal winning five of them.

The first encounter came in the final of the Indian Wells Masters. This was Djokovic's first Masters final whereas Nadal was bidding for his 7th title. Nadal won the match. Djokovic, however, got his revenge the following week, defeating Nadal for the first time, in the quarterfinals of the Miami Masters.

The pair met twice during the summer clay-court season, with Nadal continuing his dominance on clay. He defeated Djokovic en route to the title in the quarterfinals of the Rome Masters. Similarly, Nadal defeated Djokovic in the semifinals of the French Open a month later, in Djokovic's first major semifinal. They then met for the first time on grass in the semifinals of Wimbledon. After splitting the first two sets, Djokovic retired from the match due to a foot injury.

At the Canada Masters, Djokovic scored his second victory over Nadal, defeating the Spaniard in the semifinals en route to his second Masters title.

The final encounter between the two in 2007 was in the round robin phase Tennis Masters Cup, with Nadal emerging victorious.

2008 
Djokovic and Nadal met six times in 2008, with Nadal winning four of their encounters.

Djokovic defeated Nadal in the semifinals at Indian Wells Masters.

Nadal defeated Djokovic in the semifinals of the Hamburg Masters. In their third consecutive meeting at the French Open, a dominant Nadal defeated Djokovic in the semifinals en route to his fourth consecutive French Open title.

Next, they met in the final at the Queen's Club in London, where Nadal won his first grass-court title over Djokovic 7–6, 7–6.

In their fifth encounter of the year at the Cincinnati Masters, Djokovic defeated Nadal in the semifinals.

The sixth and final battle of the year came at the Beijing Olympics in the semifinals. Nadal won the match and went on to win the gold medal, while Djokovic later secured the bronze.

2009 
They met seven times in 2009. Nadal won their first four encounters, while Djokovic won the last three.

The pair met several times on clay and matches involving them became the highlights of the clay-court season. The first and only meeting to date in the Davis Cup happened in the first round of the World Group in the fourth rubber, which Nadal won to clinch the tie for Spain. They then met for the first time in a clay-court final at the Monte Carlo Masters, with Nadal winning a closely contested three-setter and his fifth consecutive Monte-Carlo title. With his world No. 3 ranking at risk, Djokovic sought to defend his title at the Rome Masters. However, he lost to Nadal in straight sets in the final.

They then met for a third consecutive Masters tournament on clay, in the semifinals of the Madrid Masters. Nadal won a grueling encounter, saving three match points in the process. The match, at 4 hours and 3 minutes, was the longest three-set singles match on the ATP Tour in the Open Era (later surpassed by the Olympic semifinal between Roger Federer and Juan Martín del Potro in 2012). The match was voted the best match of the year by fans and critics alike. Djokovic admitted afterwards that it took him a long time to get over the loss.

During the US Open series, Djokovic defeated Nadal for the first time that year at the Cincinnati Masters. Djokovic then won his first Masters title of the year, defeating Nadal in the semifinals of the Paris Masters. The pair then had their final meeting of the year at the ATP World Tour Finals in London. Djokovic won the match, going 2–1 in the round robin phase.

2010 
They met twice in 2010, and Nadal won both encounters.

Djokovic and Nadal faced off for the first time in a major final at the US Open. Nadal won the match in four sets, thus becoming the youngest player in the Open Era to complete a career Grand Slam. The match lasted 3 hours and 43 minutes.

Their second encounter came during the round-robin stage of the ATP World Tour Finals, where Nadal beat Djokovic in straight sets.

2011 
The rivalry shifted in Djokovic's favor this season. The pair met six times, all in finals, with Djokovic winning all six encounters, including two major finals.

Coming into their first encounter of the year at the Indian Wells Masters, Djokovic was undefeated for the season and continued his streak by beating Nadal to win his second Indian Wells title.

Two weeks later, the pair met again in the finals of the Miami Masters with Djokovic winning in three sets.

Djokovic and Nadal clashed twice during the clay-court spring. In the final of the Madrid Masters, Djokovic scored his first-ever victory over Nadal on clay, in straight sets. He managed the same feat at the Rome Masters, defeating Nadal in straight sets.

Djokovic and Nadal met in a final for the fifth time of the season at Wimbledon, arguably their biggest encounter of the year. In a 2-hour 28 minute contest, Djokovic overcame defending champion Nadal in four sets for his first Wimbledon title.

They met for a second consecutive major final at the US Open, a rematch of the final from the previous year, in which Nadal had prevailed. Djokovic won his third major of the year, overcoming Nadal again in four sets.

2012 
The pair met four times, all in finals, with Nadal winning three of the four encounters and Djokovic winning only one, which was a major final.

Djokovic won the 2012 Australian Open final after an epic five-set battle against Nadal.
The match lasted 5 hours 53 minutes, the longest major final in the Open Era. At the end of the match, both players were so exhausted they could not stand for the trophy presentation. Nadal called it "the greatest loss in his career" and "the best match he ever played". Djokovic said it was a moment he would never forget, and considered it a career-defining victory.

Djokovic and Nadal met again in the 2012 Monte–Carlo Masters final. This time, Nadal won his eighth consecutive title after defeating Djokovic in straight sets, ending a seven-match loss streak to Djokovic.

The pair met again in the 2012 Rome Masters final, where Nadal defeated the defending champion Djokovic in straight sets to regain the trophy he had won five times before.

The fourth battle of the year came at the 2012 French Open final. For only the second time in tennis history (after Serena and Venus Williams between the 2002 French Open and the 2003 Australian Open), two opposing tennis players played four consecutive major finals against each other. This was a match of historic proportions as either Nadal would break Björn Borg's record of six French Open titles, or Djokovic would become the first man since Rod Laver in 1969 to win four majors in a row. Nadal eventually emerged victorious after three consecutive losses in major finals, prevailing in four sets after multiple rain delays that forced the final to be concluded on the following Monday afternoon. With this victory, Nadal became the most successful male player at the French Open, winning seven French Open titles.

2013 
The pair met six times, with three victories each.

Djokovic and Nadal contested the Monte Carlo final for the third time, the twelfth time in the last thirteen occasions in which they met in a championship match. Djokovic defeated Nadal in straight sets to end the latter's eight-year reign at the tournament.

At the 2013 French Open Nadal came in as the seven-time champion and was drawn in the same half as Djokovic, due to his third seed. Nadal won the tournament after beating Djokovic in the semifinal and David Ferrer in the final. His semifinal clash with Djokovic was widely considered one of the greatest clay court matches ever played. Nadal was two points away from victory in the fourth set, but was denied by Djokovic and taken to a fifth set. There he went down a break, 4–2, only to break back and ultimately triumph 9–7 for a 4-hour, 37-minute victory. It was a unique encounter in that it was almost the mirror opposite of the almost six-hour 2012 Australian Open final they contested where Djokovic led Nadal 2–1 sets and was two points away from victory in the fourth set, only for Nadal to come back and win the fourth set in a tiebreaker and go up a break in the fifth set. In exactly the same fashion the player leading by a break in the final set committed an uncharacteristic error (Nadal missed an easy backhand pass at 30–15, 4–2 in the fifth in Melbourne, while Djokovic ran into the net after hitting a what would have been a clean winner at 4–3 in the fifth in Paris), only to spark a momentum shift for their opponent to break back and ultimately win the match. Nadal suggested that it was almost "poetic justice" that he won this match after losing their epic encounter in Australia. This was only the second time Nadal had been pushed to five sets at the French Open (the first being against John Isner in the first round of the 2011 French Open), and he remains unbeaten in five-set encounters on clay.

Djokovic and Nadal met again at the Montreal Masters semifinals, with Nadal prevailing in three sets. Nadal would then go on to win the title, marking his 25th ATP Masters championship. The US Open final saw a third Nadal-Djokovic matchup in four years, which Nadal took in four sets. The match showed Nadal's fighting spirit, as he clawed down from 0–2 at a set apiece, and from 4–4, 0–40 on his own serve. He would take the title to beat Djokovic for the sixth time out of their seven most recent meetings.

The two players faced again in the China Open final with Djokovic winning in straight sets; however, by reaching the final, Nadal retook the world No. 1 ranking from Djokovic. They met again in the championship match of the ATP Finals, where Djokovic again won in straight sets, winning his third year-end championship and denying Nadal his first. Nadal finished 2013 as world No. 1, with Djokovic as world No. 2, having won 24 consecutive matches after losing the US Open final to Nadal. Their domination in 2013 together was also apparent in the year-end rankings: together, they amassed 25,290 points, more than the numbers 3 to 7 combined.

2014 
In 2014, the pair met three times, all in finals, with Djokovic winning the first two encounters and Nadal winning the last one. Djokovic started by beating Nadal in the final of the Miami Open in straight sets, and then supplanted that victory with a three-set victory over Nadal in  Rome. In the process he acquired a four-match winning streak against the Spaniard, and also became the first player to amass four career clay-court wins over Nadal. Their last meeting of the year came in the final of the French Open, where Nadal won the match after dropping the opening set to Djokovic.

2015 
In 2015, the pair contested four matches with Djokovic winning all four. They met at the semifinal stage of the Monte-Carlo Masters. The match was competitive with Nadal producing, by his own assessment, his best performance yet of the season. However, a very in-form Djokovic prevailed.

They then faced each other at the French Open for the fourth consecutive year, this time in the quarterfinals. There, Djokovic beat Nadal in straight sets. It was Djokovic's first victory against the Spaniard in seven meetings at the tournament, Djokovic became the only man to ever beat Nadal at all four majors, the first man to beat Nadal in straight sets in a best-of-five-set match on clay, and the only man to beat Nadal on clay six times. This was also only the second time that Nadal has been defeated at the French Open, after losing to Robin Söderling in the 2009 edition of the tournament.

Nadal next played Djokovic in the China Open final, where he was comprehensively beaten by the Serb. They met yet again in the semifinals of the ATP World Tour Finals, in which Djokovic won in straight sets and leveled his head-to head with Nadal for the first time at 23–23.

2016 
In 2016, the pair met three times with all three matches going to Djokovic. In the Doha final, Djokovic won in a convincing straight set victory to lead the head-to-head for the first time. Djokovic won again in the semifinals at Indian Wells and at the quarterfinals of the Rome Masters to put the rivalry at 26–23 in Djokovic's favor with a seven-match winning streak against Nadal.

2017 
A resurgent Nadal defeated Djokovic in the Madrid Open semifinals, 6–2, 6–4 to reverse a trend of losses.

2018 
Nadal beat Djokovic in the semifinals at the Italian Open 7–6, 6–3 in their first match in over a year.

A resurgent Djokovic beat Nadal in a semifinal epic at Wimbledon in five sets stretched over two days, lasting over five hours.

2019 
Nadal and Djokovic faced each other in the Australian Open final with Djokovic comprehensively winning 6–3, 6–2, 6–3 in two hours and four minutes.

Nadal won his ninth Italian Open title, overcoming Djokovic to triumph at the Foro Italico 6–0, 4–6, 6-1 after two hours and 25 minutes. Nadal also broke a then-tie with Djokovic by claiming a record 34th ATP Masters crown.

2020 
The duo met in the ATP Cup final, their second match in a team competition (the first being at the 2009 Davis Cup). Djokovic beat Nadal 6–2, 7–6.

As the top two seeded players at the French Open, they met in the final. Nadal won in dominant fashion, 6–0, 6–2, 7–5 to claim his record-equalling 20th major title.

2021 
Nadal won his tenth Italian Open title by defeating Djokovic in a three-set final, 7–5, 1–6, 6–3.

On their ninth encounter at Roland Garros, Nadal and Djokovic met in the semifinals of the French Open, in a rematch of the previous year's final. This time, Djokovic upset Nadal in four sets 3–6, 6–3, 7–6(7–4), 6–2. It was his second win against Nadal at the French Open and Nadal's only third loss at Roland Garros.

2022 
Djokovic and Nadal met at the French Open for the third consecutive year and tenth time overall, in the quarterfinals. In a four-hour battle, Nadal won in four sets, 6–2, 4–6, 6–2, 7–6(7–4), before going on to win the title for a 14th time. This marked the first occasion in tennis history that two players have met at a single tournament ten times.

Analysis 
Commentators Dick Enberg, John McEnroe, and Mary Carillo have said that this rivalry has the potential of being the greatest rivalry in tennis history due to the number of matches already played between the two, the quality of the matches, and the age difference of only one year.

Djokovic is the player with the most career wins against Nadal. Likewise, Nadal is the player with the most career wins against Djokovic. Djokovic is the only player to have defeated Nadal in four clay-court finals, the only player to defeat Nadal at the French Open in straight sets, the only player to defeat Nadal twice at the French Open, and the only player to defeat Nadal in seven consecutive finals. Both play a similar style of tennis but have differences that make their matches competitive and unique. Djokovic is the only player to defeat Nadal in three consecutive grand slam finals and the only player to defeat Nadal in all four grand slams (Australian Open, French Open, Wimbledon and US Open). Conversely, Nadal is the only player to defeat Djokovic in two hard court slam finals (US Open 2010 and 2013).

The rivalry has seen dominance shift back and forth, with Nadal winning sixteen of their first twenty-three matches, followed by Djokovic beating Nadal seven times in a row, then Nadal winning six of seven, and Djokovic winning fifteen of the last twenty-two.

Many pundits have claimed this to be the greatest rivalry of the Open Era, given the number of records it has produced, the quality of their matches, it having the most encounters in the Open Era, and the number of classic matches it has produced that are unrivaled by any other. In 2009, it was rated the third best rivalry of the last decade, even though it only began in 2006.

Grand Slam tournament 
Nadal and Djokovic have each won 22 Grand Slam tournament titles. Both Nadal and Djokovic completed multiple Career Grand Slams—Nadal in 2010/2022 and Djokovic in 2016/2021. Both have achieved a Surface Slam by winning major titles across three different surfaces in the same year—Nadal in 2010 and Djokovic in 2021. In 2015–16 Djokovic managed to be the reigning champion of all four Grand Slam tournaments at once becoming the only player in history to have done so across three different surfaces. Djokovic's Grand Slam tournament titles include 13 on hard courts, 7 on grass, and 2 on clay, while Nadal's Grand Slam tournament titles include 14 on clay, 6 on hard courts, and 2 on grass.

 Bold indicates outright record.

ATP Masters 
Djokovic holds the record for the most Masters titles with 38, while Nadal is second with 36. Nadal has won 26 on clay and 10 on hard courts. Djokovic has won 27 on hard courts and 11 on clay and is the only player to have won all 9 Masters tournaments completing the Career Golden Masters, having done so twice. Nadal is missing two titles (Miami and Paris).

 Bold indicates outright record of the ATP Masters tournament.

Year-end Championship 
Djokovic has won a joint-record 6 ATP Finals titles in total (shared with Roger Federer), while Nadal has not won the event, only reaching the final in 2010 and 2013. Djokovic has a 3–2 advantage over Nadal in the event and won their only meeting in the title match in 2013.

 Bold indicates outright record.

ATP/ITF rankings 

 Bold indicates outright record.

National and international representation 
Djokovic and Nadal faced each other at the 2008 Olympics and in the 2009 Davis Cup. Nadal won their only meeting at the Olympics in the semi-finals of the 2008 Men's Singles event. Nadal also won their only match so far at the Davis Cup in the 1st round tie of the 2009 event. Djokovic won their most recent match while representing their countries in the finals of the inaugural ATP Cup in Sydney. Other ITF/ATP team events played by them are Hopman Cup by Djokovic, United Cup by Nadal and Laver Cup by both for Europe.

Head-to-head tallies 
 All matches (59):   Djokovic, 30–29
 All finals (28):  Djokovic, 15–13 
 Grand Slam matches: Nadal, 11–7
 Australian Open: Djokovic, 2–0
 French Open: Nadal, 8–2
 Wimbledon: Djokovic, 2–1
 US Open: Nadal, 2–1
 ATP Finals matches: Djokovic, 3–2
 ATP Masters matches: Djokovic, 16–13
 Other matches: Djokovic, 4–3
 ATP Cup (Team Event): Djokovic, 1–0
 Grand Slam finals: Nadal, 5–4
 ATP Finals finals: Djokovic, 1–0
 ATP Masters finals: Tied 7–7
 Other finals: Djokovic, 3–1

Results on each court surface 
 Clay courts: Nadal 20–8
 Hard courts: Djokovic 20–7
 Outdoor: Djokovic 16–5
 Indoor: Djokovic 4–2
 Grass courts: Tied 2–2

Tournament overview

Grand Slam matches
 Final matches indicated in bold.

Completed set tallies

Famous matches

2009 Madrid Masters semifinal
With Nadal widely regarded as invincible on clay courts by many in the tennis world, Djokovic emerged as one of the few who could test his dominance on it, and the closest Nadal came to losing for the first time in this tournament came in May 2009. It was the longest Masters match and semifinal in Open Era history. Djokovic ranked No. 4 in the world, took the first set 6–3. But the world No. 1 Nadal remained resilient, saving three match points and eventually ending up winning in three sets after four hours and two minutes in what he called one of his greatest wins in his career.

2010 US Open final
Nadal needed this title to complete his Golden Career Slam, creating much hype before the tournament.  Even more so when he would have to face Djokovic who had an excellent record on this surface. Nadal had perfected his serve to the point where it became his most dangerous weapon. He ended up winning the match and becoming the fourth man in the Open Era (after Rod Laver, Andre Agassi, and Roger Federer) to complete a Career Grand Slam and the second man in the open era to complete a Career Golden Slam after Andre Agassi. Furthermore, Nadal became the fifth man in the Open Era to win three of the four grand slams in the same year.

2011 Wimbledon final

The 2011 Wimbledon final would put the world No. 1 ranked and defending champion Nadal against the No. 2 ranked Djokovic who was looking for his first Wimbledon title. Nadal, on a 20-match winning streak at the All England Club, was favoured by many to win despite Djokovic coming into the match with four finals victories over Nadal during the year. However, with a four set victory, Djokovic became the first Serbian man to win Wimbledon and for the first time overtook Nadal for the No. 1 ranking.

2011 US Open final
The 2011 US Open final had Nadal as the defending champion after defeating Djokovic the prior year but with Djokovic having defeated Nadal in five finals including a victory over Nadal in the Wimbledon final earlier in the year, expectations were high on Djokovic to win his first US Open title. In a match lasting 4 hours and 10 minutes, Djokovic defeated Nadal for a sixth consecutive finals victory over Nadal. With the win, Djokovic became the sixth man in the open era to win three of the four majors in the same year.

2012 Australian Open final

This match was the third straight Djokovic vs Nadal major final. It was the longest Grand Slam final in history with Djokovic prevailing 7–5 in the fifth set in 5 hours 53 minutes. Both players were exhausted to the extent that chairs had to be brought out during presentation. The momentum switched several times throughout the match, at one stage Djokovic being only two points from winning the fourth set and thus the championship. However, Nadal managed to force a deciding set. He went up a break in the fifth set, but the turning point was when he missed a backhand winner at the net at 4–2 30–15, and lost his chance to consolidate his break. Tennis legends Mats Wilander, Björn Borg, Andre Agassi, Pete Sampras, John McEnroe, Boris Becker, and Stefan Edberg have all responded saying this was the greatest match of all time. The amount of social media chatter on Facebook and Twitter on the match was never seen before in tennis. Many congratulated both players for playing the greatest match ever witnessed, and news media also commented on the insurmountable quality of the match itself. With the win, Djokovic brought his win streak against Nadal to seven, all of which were in finals and 3 being grand slam finals.

2012 French Open final

This match was the fourth straight Djokovic vs Nadal major final. Rafael Nadal won the first set 6–4, Nadal gaining a break of serve after a long attritional battle. There were several delays due to the erratic rain, but none lasting more than an hour. With Nadal leading by two sets to one, and Djokovic leading 2–1 and serving (up a break) in the fourth set, the match was suspended due to rain; it was initially thought that Djokovic had gained the momentum, having won eight games in a row prior to the suspension of the match, however, Nadal was able to regroup and take the fourth set, and ultimately the match, after Djokovic double-faulted on championship point down.

2013 French Open semifinal
Björn Borg dubbed it the greatest clay court match ever. John McEnroe called it one of the top 5 matches of all time. Both players produced incredible tennis in what was a mirror image of the 2012 Australian Open final. The match had momentum swings throughout the entire affair but the most important occurred late in the fifth set when Djokovic, up a break, touched the net on a winner that would have put him in position to serve for the match, losing the point. He never recovered mentally from this mistake and Nadal saved the break and immediately broke back, eventually winning the final set.

2015 French Open quarterfinal
Djokovic defeated Nadal ending a 39 match winning streak at the tournament in straight sets. After a highly competitive first set, Nadal's level declined in the second and third allowing Djokovic to finally get the better of him at the tournament he had dominated for the last ten years. It was the second time Nadal lost in the French Open and the only time he lost in straight sets at the event. Djokovic eventually lost in the final to Stan Wawrinka.

2018 Wimbledon semifinal
Djokovic defeated Nadal in a thrilling five set match, lasting 5 hours, 15 minutes and played over two days. The match was highly anticipated early on, as Nadal, the world No. 1, had not progressed beyond the fourth round at Wimbledon since 2011 (where he lost to Djokovic in the final), and Djokovic on the other hand was recovering from a long elbow injury and had dropped down in the rankings. Before the match, Nadal was considered as the slight favourite due to his far superior form that year, including a straight-set victory over Djokovic at the Italian Open. Due to delay caused by a six-and-half hour semifinal between Kevin Anderson and John Isner, the match started in the late Friday evening. Djokovic and Nadal won the first and second sets respectively. The third set entered the tiebreak and Djokovic saved three set points to win the set. As Wimbledon does not permit match play after 11:00 p.m, the match was halted after three sets. The fourth set, played next day, featured a lot of break point opportunities for both players, but eventually it was Nadal who took the set. In the fifth set, both players held serve for the first seventeen games, despite Nadal having break points in ninth and fifteenth games, and Djokovic in eighth and sixteenth games. In the end, Djokovic broke Nadal's serve at love to seal the match.

2021 French Open semifinal
Djokovic defeated Nadal in a bruising four set encounter, lasting 4 hours, 11 minutes. Nadal raced into a 5–0 lead, taking the first set 6–3, only for Djokovic to level, taking the second set by the same scoreline. The third set, lasting 97 minutes, was described as one of the greatest sets ever, which Djokovic took on a tiebreak after surviving a set point. Despite Nadal taking a 2–0 lead in the fourth set, Djokovic won the next six games, to hand Nadal just his third ever defeat at the French Open in his 108th match at the tournament. Djokovic would go on to win the title, becoming the first man in the Open Era to win each of the four Grand Slams on multiple occasions. The match was praised by many as the best of the season.

List of all matches 
ATP, ATP Cup, Davis Cup, and Grand Slam tournament main draw results included.

Singles (59)
Djokovic 30 – Nadal 29

Doubles 
Djokovic–Nadal (0–2)

As a pair (0–1)

Exhibition matches
In Bogotá on March 21, 2011, Nadal beat Djokovic in their first exhibition match and the highest caliber match ever played in Colombia. A second exhibition, with proceeds to benefit a foundation run by Nadal and the football team Real Madrid, was scheduled for July 14, 2012 in Real Madrid's Santiago Bernabéu Stadium, but cancelled because of injury to Nadal.

Djokovic—Nadal (3–3)

Djokovic–Nadal era

Combined singles performance timeline (best result)

1 Tournament cancelled due to the COVID-19 pandemic.

Grand Slam tournaments

ATP No. 1 era 

Represents ATP rankings record.

Significant achievements 
 Only two male players in the Open Era to play 59 matches against one another.
 Only two male players in the Open Era to play 28 finals.
 Only two male players to win 59+ Big Titles.
 Only two male players to win 22 Grand Slam titles.
 Only two male players to win a single Grand Slam at least 10 times, Nadal in the French Open, Djokovic in the Australian Open.
 Only two male players to win 36+ Masters titles.
 Only two male players to complete multiple Career Grand Slams across three different surfaces.
 Only two male players to achieve a Surface Slam.
 Most Grand Slam tournament meetings – 18
 Most Grand Slam tournament finals – 9 (tied with Federer–Nadal).
 Only two players to have played each other 29 times in ATP Masters tournaments.
 Only two players to have played each other 10 times in a single tournament (French Open).
 Longest titles streak at one Masters tournament (Rome) with 11 consecutive titles, 2005–2015, Nadal 7 titles, Djokovic 4 titles.
 Longest finals streak at one Masters tournament (Rome) with 18 consecutive finals, 2005–2022.
 Only two players to hold all 9 ATP Masters titles at once between them (2013 Monte-Carlo to 2014 Miami), Djokovic 5 titles, Nadal 4 titles.
 Longest Grand Slam final ever played (2012 Australian Open) at 5 hours and 53 minutes
 Longest three-set match of the Open Era with tie-break in deciding set (at the 2009 Madrid Masters)
 Only male pair to have met in four consecutive Grand Slam finals (2011 Wimbledon–2012 French Open).
 First male pair to have met in each of the four Grand Slam finals (since matched by Djokovic and Murray).
 Most consecutive seasons in the Open Era playing a Grand Slam final (5), from 2010 to 2014. 
 Doubles team made up of singles No. 1 and No. 2. (shared with Connors and Ashe)
 Djokovic and Nadal hold the all-time record of titles in their respective favoured Grand Slam tournaments. Nadal's at the French Open and Djokovic at the Australian Open. Neither player has lost a final in those respective events.
 First pair to win Grand Slams in three different decades: Nadal ('00s–6, '10s–13, '20s–3), Djokovic ('00s–1, '10s–15, '20s–6).
 Oldest pair in the Open Era to play the French Open final (in 2020), with Nadal aged 34 and Djokovic aged 33 to put them at a combined age of 67.

Performance timeline comparison

Grand Slam tournaments 

 Bold indicates players met during the tournament.

2005–2010

2011–2016

2017–2022

2023–present

ATP rankings

Year-end ranking timeline

Career evolution
 updated Monday, 13 March 2023

See also 
 Big Three
 List of tennis rivalries
 Federer–Nadal rivalry
 Djokovic–Federer rivalry
 Djokovic–Murray rivalry
 Rafael Nadal career statistics
 Novak Djokovic career statistics
 List of Grand Slam men's singles champions

References

External links 
Djokovic–Nadal head-to-head
ATP Tennis Rivalries:Novak & Rafa – The Rivalry
Photos from the Key Djokovic v Nadal matches 

Novak Djokovic
Rafael Nadal
Tennis rivalries